Ekinchi ibn Qochar (d. 1097) was the Seljuk governor of Khwarazm briefly in 1097, bearing the traditional title of Khwarazmshah. Unlike the Khwarazmshahs that succeeded him, he was not a descendant of Anushtegin Gharchai.

Following the death of Anushtegin, Ekinchi was given the position of Khwarazmshah by the Seljuk sultan Berkyaruq. After a short period of time, however, he was killed by several Seljuk amirs that had risen in revolt. After he died, he was replaced with Anushtegin's son, Qutb al-Din Muhammad.

Ekinchi literally means "farmer" or "ploughman" in Turkic languages.

References
 
 
 
 

Khwarezmid rulers
1090s deaths
Year of birth unknown
11th-century Turkic people
Anushtegin dynasty